Simulmondo was an Italian software house from Bologna. Specialized video game developer and publisher, it has produced about 150 videogames for Commodore 64, Amiga, PC and Atari ST.

Originally founded in 1988 by Francesco Carlà and Riccardo Arioti, via an agreement with publisher Ital Video, Simulmondo was among the most important game developers in Italy in the late 1980s and early 1990s, developing mostly titles for home computers. 

Simulmondo released games manly for the Amiga, MS-DOS and the Commodre 64 platform. The latest Simulmondo's game, middle 90s, had been released for Windows 95 platform. For the distribution of the games, Simulmondo used an innovative strategy for the time: Simulmondo branched out into an early form of episodic gaming, by publishing short adventures that could be completed in one or two hours and distributed them on newsstands at a price much lower than that of the complete games sold in a normal shop. In this way Simulmondo could reduce development costs and maximize profits. Games where usually distributed as tapes or floppys.

Simulmondo's most famous games where licensed videogames based on comic books like Dylan Dog, Spider-man and Tex Willer.

By 1993 the company had lost many of its original programmers and artists, like Ivan Venturi, and, by the following year, Simulmondo had all but disappeared from the mainstream video games market. In its final years, the software house developed games for television programs, like interactive games for the kids program Solletico and a football engine for Processo di Biscardi.

List of games 

Note: We are Angels was developed by Simulmondo but released by ARI GAMES, it's a game based from the TV serie Noi siamo Angeli.

Cancelled titles

References

External links 
 
 https://archive.org/stream/the-games-machine-italia-80#page/n15/mode/1up
 https://archive.org/stream/computer-videogiochi-11-speciale#page/n97/mode/1uphttps://issuu.com/adpware/docs/mc178/215
 https://www.advancedstudios.it/forum/index.php?/topic/3340-mos%C3%A8-il-profeta-della-libert%C3%A0/http://www.ag.ru/games/1st-chess-tutor
 Once We Were Giants: the History of Simulmondo on The Genesis Temple, a thorough history of the company in two parts.

Companies based in Bologna
Video game companies established in 1987
Video game companies disestablished in 1999
Defunct video game companies of Italy
Video game development companies